Prasan Suvannasith (7 October 1933 – 6 April 2016) was a Thai footballer. He competed in the men's tournament at the 1956 Summer Olympics.

References

External links
 

1933 births
2016 deaths
Prasan Suvannasith
Prasan Suvannasith
Prasan Suvannasith
Footballers at the 1956 Summer Olympics
Prasan Suvannasith
Association football defenders